George Orwell's 1945 allegorical novel Animal Farm contains various anthems adopted by the eponymous farm, most notably the original anthem "Beasts of England" and its later replacement "Comrade Napoleon".

The later song "Comrade Napoleon" praises Napoleon and fails to represent freedom at all. This change is used to show the corruption of the principles of the animals' rebellion by Animal Farm's leader Napoleon. Both The Internationale and "Beasts of England" reflected the principles of Marxism and Animalism, respectively. Their replacement by different anthems reflects how these ideologies were arguably distorted by Stalin and Napoleon and thus had to be replaced and suppressed.

The development corresponds to the historical events of 1943, when Joseph Stalin had The Internationale, previously the anthem of the Soviet Union, replaced with a new, more patriotic national anthem. However, while "Beasts of England" was outlawed in the novel, The Internationale was not banned by the Soviet Union at any time and remained as the anthem of the Communist Party.

"Beasts of England"

"Beasts of England", the original anthem of the Animal Farm corresponds to the famous socialist anthem, The Internationale, but also alludes to Shelley's Men of England.

In the book, the pig Old Major explains his dream of an animal-controlled society three nights before his death. The song's tune is described in the novel as sounding like a combination of "La Cucaracha" and "Oh My Darling Clementine".

Alternate melodies: "Ode to Joy" or "Joyful, Joyful, we adore Thee" or "Come Thou Fount of every Blessing" or "Ebenezer", "Anthem of the Soviet Republics", or the 1954 anthem's tune.

Beasts of England, Beasts of Ireland,Beasts of every land and clime, Hearken to my joyful tidings Of the Golden future time.

Soon or late the day is coming,Tyrant Man shall be o'erthrown, And the fruitful fields of England Shall be trod by beasts alone.

Rings shall vanish from our noses,And the harness from our back, Bit and spur shall rust forever, Cruel whips no more shall crack.

Riches more than mind can picture,Wheat and barley, oats and hay,Clover, beans, and mangel-wurzels Shall be ours upon that day.

Bright will shine the fields of England,Purer shall its waters be,Sweeter yet shall blow its breezes On the day that sets us free.

For that day we all must labour,Though we die before it break; Cows and horses, geese and turkeys, All must toil for freedom's sake.

Beasts of England, Beasts of Ireland,Beasts of every land and clime,Hearken well, and spread my tidings Of the Golden future time.

The animals sing "Beasts of England" frequently after the rebellion, especially after meetings. At one point when Clover the horse questions the direction of Animal Farm, she sings "Beasts of England" which causes the other animals to join in.

After "Beasts of England" has been used to express criticism of the direction of Animal Farm, Napoleon tries to supplant the song, arguing that such an anthem is antiquated and no longer needed after the rebellion has been completed. The anthem is first replaced by the short "Animal Farm!" and later by "Comrade Napoleon", while "Beasts of England" is eventually outlawed. The phasing out of "Beasts of England" as the anthem of Animal Farm corresponds to the Soviet Union's 1944 replacement of The Internationale with the National Anthem of the Soviet Union. However, while "Beasts of England" was banned in Animal Farm, "The Internationale" was not in the Soviet Union at any time and remained the anthem of the Communist Party.

Suzanne Gulbin compares the role of "Beasts of England" to that of the conch in William Golding's Lord of the Flies: it serves to create enthusiasm and unity, and its banning represents the loss of hope for a better life. Florence and William Boos read the fact that the animals continue to sing "Beasts of England" after it is banned as a testimony to the power of the memory of Old Major.

"Animal Farm!"
"Animal Farm!" is the anthem first replacing "Beasts of England" after Squealer manages to convince the other animals that the original anthem is not required. Its purpose is to inspire loyalty to the farm, and also to the new leadership. Minimus the poet composes a short, new anthem which starts:

Animal Farm, Animal Farm,Never through me shall thou come to harm!But it is noted that it does not inspire the animals as much as "Beasts of England."

Paul Kirschner writes that the switch from "Beasts of England" to "Animal Farm!" is a parody of the transition from Lenin's proletarian internationalism to Stalin's "Socialism in One Country".  The song itself is most likely a reference to the State Anthem of the Soviet Union.

"Comrade Napoleon"

As Napoleon became more powerful, he replaced "Beasts of England" with another anthem, again written by Minimus. The anthem praised and glorified Napoleon, attributing many of the successes on the farm to him, even though he had little or no role in them. The poem marked the general happy feeling towards the rule of Napoleon at the time in the book and was painted on the wall of the big barn opposite the Seven Commandments. It was capped by a portrait of Napoleon drawn by Squealer in white paint.Friend of the fatherless! Fountain of happiness!Lord of the swill-bucket!Oh, how my soul is onFire when I gaze at thy Calm and commanding eye, Like the sun in the sky, Comrade Napoleon!Thou art the giver of All that thy creatures love, Full belly twice a day, clean straw to roll upon;Every beast great or small Sleeps at peace in his stall, Thou watchest over all,Comrade Napoleon!Had I a sucking-pig, Ere he had grown as big Even as a pint bottle or a rolling-pin, He should have learned to be Faithful and true to thee, Yes, his first squeak should be "Comrade Napoleon!"1999 film adaptation

In the 1999 film adaptation, "Beasts of England" is replaced with a song "Beasts of the World", which has its own tune and different lyrics:Beasts of the world we shall uniteRise up and ready for the fightSoon or late the day will beWhen Man's defeated and we are freeSoon or late the day will beWhen Man's defeated and we are freeThough our lives be lives full of miseryOur limbs be tired and wornOur dreams will not be brokenAnd our hearts will not be tornOur dreams will not be brokenAnd our hearts will not be tornThere is a reprise of the song but the second verse is changed, but it's a bit difficult to understand:Though our lives be lives full of miseryThe war has been won in the fieldsWe'll sing the song of justiceSo stained the freedom's shieldWe'll sing the song of justiceSo stained the freedom's shield"Comrade Napoleon" is replaced by a song titled "Glorious Leader Napoleon", put to the tune of the Russian song "V Put":Beloved leader Napoleon,fearless faithful guardian!Proud and strong,protect us from the wrong,you will defend uswith your lofty trotter.Our pigs, our pigs, our pigs:there is no beast that’s braver!They will not ever waver!They face the fight,for right with might.Glorious, great and triumphant,gallant hero resilient!Proud and strong,protect us from the wrong,you will defend uswith your lofty trotterOur pigs, our pigs, our pigs.In the same film, a new song was written for Napoleon by a "grateful duck", called "Napoleon, Mighty Leader" (known as "The Song of the Grateful Duck" in the soundtrack).Praise to him, the font of all our wisdomLong to live, the ruler of our farmNapoleon, mighty leaderMighty leader watching over usNapoleon, mighty leaderMighty leader watching over us Shout, shout, shout out loudSnout, snout, pink and proudFriend on high, you guide us with your smileTeach us how to be as kind as youNapoleon, mighty leaderMighty leader watching over usNapoleon, mighty leaderMighty leader watching over usShout, shout, shout out loudSnout, snout, pink and proud Perfect pig, you bless us with your beautyHallowed hog, how wondrous is your glowNapoleon, mighty leaderMighty leader watching over usNapoleon, mighty leaderMighty leader watching over us Shout, shout, shout out loudSnout, snout, pink and proudFour legs good, two legs better. (6x)''

References

Animal Farm
Fictional musical works
1945 songs